Lentinula reticeps is a species of agaric fungus in the family Omphalotaceae. It was originally described as Agaricus reticeps by French mycologist Camille Montagne in 1856. William Alphonso Murrill transferred it to the genus Lentinula in 1915.

References

External links

Fungi described in 1856
Fungi of North America
Marasmiaceae